The Suhu is a left tributary of the river Geru in Romania. It flows into the Geru near Piscu. It is also known as Suhurlui, but the Suhurlui is also a right tributary of the Suhu. Before the regularization of the lower course of the Siret, it was a tributary of the Bârlădel, a branch of the Siret. After the embankment of the Siret plain, the upper course of the Bârladel became the lower reach of the Geru.

Tributaries

The following rivers are tributaries to the river Suhu (from source to mouth):

Left: Valea Vacii, Valea Satului
Right: Suhurlui, Perișani, Valea Rea

References

Rivers of Romania
Rivers of Galați County